The National shooting range was a firing range and military training complex of  situated in the municipality of Schaerbeek in Brussels, Belgium. During World Wars I and II the site was used for the executions of civilians, prisoners and captured members of the Belgian Resistance.

History
The first range was started in 1859 by then-Prime Minister Charles Rogier, and mayor of Schaerbeek, Eugene Dailly, at the Prince Baudouin barracks at the Place Dailly/Daillyplein. This first range was abandoned in 1886 by the Government due to obsolescence. Modernisation of weapons meant that longer ranges were required.
  
The Shooting Commission (Commission du Tir) decided to build a larger venue to permit members of the Garde Civique to practise over longer distances. In 1886, work was begun on a plateau at Linthout on the modern Boulevard Reyers/Reyerslaan. The centre opened in 1889. The building included a  indoor range which was used by the Garde Civique and army until 1945. In 1963, the centre was demolished. The site is now occupied by a media complex for the Belgian public broadcasters RTBF and VRT.

The centre had become a focus of Belgian patriotism. During both world wars, it had been under the control of the occupying German forces and was used for executions. Amongst those executed at the site were the English nurse Edith Cavell (on 12 October 1915) and Gabrielle Petit (on 1 April 1916). In World War II, prisoners held at Saint-Gilles Prison were taken to the Tir national to be executed. The only remaining building is dedicated to Edith Cavell. There is a small cemetery, close to the present television centre, known as the Enclos des fusillés ("Enclosure of the executed"). There are 365 tombs, and a pillar among the graves marks the location of the urn containing the remains of victims of the concentration camps in 1940–1945.

People executed at the Tir national

World War I
 Philippe Baucq, (Shot 12 October 1915)
 Edith Cavell, (Shot 12 October 1915)
 Gabrielle Petit, (Shot 1 April 1916)

World War II
 Abraham Fogelbaum, (Shot 21 January 1942)
 Adelin Hartveld, (Shot 21 January 1942)
 Victor Thonet, (Shot 20 April 1943)
 André Bertulot, (Shot 10 May 1943)
 Arnaud Fraiteur, (Shot 10 May 1943)
 Maurice Raskin, (Shot 10 May 1943)
Gaston Bidoul, (Shot 20 October 1943 - member of Réseau Comète)
Emile Delbruyère, (Shot 20 October 1943 - member of  Réseau Comète)
Jean Ingels, (Shot 20 October 1943 - member of Réseau Comète)
Robert Roberts-Jones, (Shot 20 October 1943 - member of Réseau Comète)
Georges Maréchal, (Shot 20 October 1943 - member of Réseau Comète)
Albert Mélot, (Shot 20 October 1943 - member of Réseau Comète)
Eric de Menten de Horne, (Shot 20 October 1943 - member of Réseau Comète)
Ghislain Neybergh, (Shot 20 October 1943 - member of Réseau Comète)
Henri Rasquin, (Shot 20 October 1943 - member of Réseau Comète)
Antoine Renaud, (Shot 20 October 1943 - member of Réseau Comète)
Edouard Verpraet, (Shot 20 October 1943 - member of Réseau Comète)
 Alexandre Livchitz, (Shot 10 February 1944)
 Youra Livchitz, (Shot 17 February 1944)
 Lucien Orfinger, (Shot 26 February 1944)
 Anton Winterink (Shot 6 July 1944)

References

Bibliography

 
 History:

External links

Buildings and structures in Brussels
Schaerbeek
World War II sites in Belgium
World War I sites in Belgium
Shooting ranges in Belgium
Execution sites
Buildings and structures completed in 1889
1889 establishments in Belgium
Buildings and structures demolished in 1963